The Government Bank Insurance Fund is a Norwegian fund for deposit insurance.

References

Government agencies of Norway
Banking in Norway
Organizations established in 1991
1991 establishments in Norway
Deposit insurance